Bukhara or Bokhara can refer to:
 Bukhara, a city in Uzbekistan
 Bukhara Region of Uzbekistan, also known as 'Buxoro Region' or 'Buxoro Viloyati'
 the Bukhara meteorite of 2001, which fell in Bukhara, Uzbekistan (see Meteorite falls)
 Bukhara International Airport, an airport serving the city
 FK Buxoro, a football club based in the city
 Bukhara, a former country in Central Asia centered on the city of Bukhara.  Known at various times as:
 The Khanate of Bukhara (16th–18th centuries)
 The Emirate of Bukhara (1785–1920)
 The Bukharan People's Soviet Republic (1920–1924)
 Kogon, formerly named New Bukhara until 1935
 Bukhara, a village in Russia
 Bukhara, Bashkortostan
 Bukhara, Vologda Oblast
 Bukhara magazine, an Iranian Persian-language magazine
 Bukhara Caravanserai, a caravanserai in Baku, Azerbaijan
 Bukhara (restaurant) A restaurant in New Delhi, India
 Bukhara rug, an erroneous but (in the West) common term for Turkmen rugs
 Buxar, aka Bukhara, Bihar in India
 Bokhara River, a river in Australia
 Buhara, a character from Hunter × Hunter
 Bakhra, aka Bukhara, Muzaffarpur district
 Bukharan Jews, a population of Jews from Central Asia